was a 2011 court ruling by the Supreme Court of the United Kingdom. The case concerned an intellectual property dispute over the production of Lucasfilm's Stormtrooper costumes by model maker Andrew Ainsworth. Mr Ainsworth argued that the helmets, which he continues to manufacture and sell, were functional props covered only by design right legislation, as opposed to Lucasfilm's assertion that they were sculptures or art which fall under copyright law. Design right protection is retained for 15 or 10 years, whereas copyright protection in this case would last 70 years after the death of the author.

Case background 
The Stormtrooper character first appeared in the film Star Wars Episode IV: A New Hope.  The character was conceived by George Lucas, designed by artist Ralph McQuarrie, sculpted by Liz Moore and Brian Muir, and finally molded from the existing designs by Andrew Ainsworth. Before the case came to court, Ainsworth had sold replica Stormtrooper outfits online for many years causing Lucasfilm to sue for infringement of copyright. Ainsworth did not defend the 2006 case in the US courts and defaulted. Accordingly, the United States District Court for the Central District of California gave summary judgement in favour of Lucasfilm, awarding a USD $20 million compensation.

In the English courts, Lucasfilm was represented by Michael Bloch QC and Jonathan Sumption QC.
Mr. Ainsworth was represented by Alastair Wilson QC and George Hamer.

Court ruling 
The Supreme Court ruled that the Stormtrooper helmets could not be considered a sculpture for the purposes of section 4 of the Copyright, Designs and Patents Act 1988. On the issue of the justiciability of a foreign copyright claim, the court ruled that providing that there is in personam jurisdiction over a defendant, an English court does have jurisdiction in this area. On this point, the case was distinguished from British South Africa v Companhia de Mocambique, that expressed the general principle that English courts have no jurisdiction to entertain an action to determine title, where claims applied to foreign intellectual property rights.

As part of their conclusions on the justiciability question, Lord Walker and Lord Collins stated:

They went on further to state:

See also 
Copyright law in the United Kingdom
2011 Judgments of the Supreme Court of the United Kingdom

References

External links 
 BBC: How to make a Stormtrooper Helmet - Mr Ainsworth demonstrating how to make a Stormtrooper helmet

Supreme Court of the United Kingdom cases
Star Wars
United Kingdom copyright case law
2011 in British law
2011 in case law
Lucasfilm